"Happy Hour" is a song by the American rock band Weezer. It was released as the second single from their eleventh studio album Pacific Daydream on October 31, 2017. The song previously premiered at Beats 1 on October 18.

Composition
"Happy Hour" is a departure from Weezer's usual distorted guitar sound, instead featuring a layered production and slower tempo. Vocalist Rivers Cuomo stated "We really challenged ourselves to leave behind the Nineties distorted guitar, downstroke eighth note thing and try to see what else we can do." Arielle Gordon of Spin described the song as a "breezy, carefree jaunt that feels more like a Kardashian interstitial than a loner anthem."

The song has been characterized as pop rock and R&B.

Reception
Gideon Plotnicki at Liveforlivemusic.com gave "Happy Hour" a positive reaction, stating "The song is certainly a departure from the band's signature sound, however, in the end, "Happy Hour" is a good and acceptable pop song. Allan Raible from ABC News described it as a "focus track", adding "somewhere between its dance beat and its oddball, random cultural references, this song really clicks."

Charts

Weekly charts

Year-end charts

References

2017 singles
2017 songs
American contemporary R&B songs
American pop rock songs
Songs about alcohol
Songs about loneliness
Songs written by Rivers Cuomo
Weezer songs